Valentine Marion Sowder (October 5, 1866 – August 18, 1956) was an American Republican politician who served as a member of the Virginia Senate and House of Delegates.

References

External links

1866 births
1956 deaths
Republican Party Virginia state senators
20th-century American politicians
People from Floyd County, Virginia